Daniel Robert Moore (born 11 October 1988 in Inverness) is a retired Scottish footballer. Most recently, he was with Highland League club Rothes in the dual role of player/Assistant Manager.

He has previously played for Ross County, Peterhead, Nairn County and Elgin City.

References

External links

1988 births
Living people
Association football defenders
Scottish footballers
Footballers from Inverness
Ross County F.C. players
Peterhead F.C. players
Elgin City F.C. players
Scottish Football League players
Nairn County F.C. players
Rothes F.C. players
Highland Football League players
Scottish Professional Football League players